Bamangola is a village in Bamangola CD Block in Malda Sadar subdivision of Malda district in the state of West Bengal, India.

Geography

Location

As per the Map of Bamangola block in the District Census Handbook, Malda, Bamangola is a part of Bamangram, a village.

Tangon River flows past Bamangola.

Police station
Bamangola police station under West Bengal police has jurisdiction over Bamangola CD Block.

Demographics
As per the 2011 Census of India, Bamungram had a total population of 2,994, of which 1,534 (51%) were males and 1,459 (49%) were females. Population below 6 years was 307. The total number of literates in Bamungram was 1,878 (69.89% of the population over 6 years).

Transport
Bamangola Road and Nalagola-Pakuahat-Malda Road link it to National Highway 12 at Malda on one side, and on the other Gazole-Bamangola Road links it to NH 12 at Gazole.

Education
Bamangola High School, founded in 1938, is a Bengali-medium co-educational higher secondary school, with facilities for teaching from Class VI to Class XII. It is housed in a government building, has 2,577 books in the library and has a playground etc.

References

Villages in Malda district